Jeremy Fischer may refer to:

 Jeremy Fischer (politician), American attorney and politician from Maine
 Jeremy Fischer (athlete), American track and field athlete and coach

See also
Jeremy Fisher (disambiguation)